Among the factors that influenced the Cold War were the detention of several hundred Americans in Gulags,  in addition to the obstacles in returning some 2,000 American POWs out of an estimated 75,000 who ended up in the Soviet occupation zone of Germany by 1945, as well as the reunification of Soviet wives with their American husbands.

Americans in Soviet-occupied territories
Some 5,000 Americans fell into Soviet hands when the Red Army occupied Eastern Poland in 1939. Some 2,000 more claiming American citizenship were added when the Soviets pushed the Nazis from Poland in 1944. Of the latter ones about 600 cases were confirmed and about 100 proved to be false. Many of all of these claimed dual Polish and American citizenship. The mistreatment of American citizens ranged from denying consular access to incarceration in a gulag to execution. Most of them, together with the local population, were forcibly assigned Soviet citizenship, even the American-born Americans. Attempts to renounce this citizenship or to contact the American embassy were blocked; these people were harassed by the authorities, and those who were most insistent landed in a gulag on trumped-up charges. There was a similar situation in the Baltic States. The protests by the United States were stonewalled by the Soviets. The situation went to the extremes: the American embassy strongly advised not to insist on American citizenship in the cases when the person was threatened with the arrest.

Cold War wars and espionage
A number of  Americans, mostly military pilots, were captured during the Korean War in North Korea and ended up in the Soviet Union. In a 1992 letter, Boris Yeltsin stated that nine US planes had been shot down in the early 1950s and 12 Americans had been held as prisoners.  As a result, in March 1992, a joint Russian-American task force was created to review these cases. Dmitri Volkogonov, a former Soviet general and co-chairman of the Task Force Russia told a US Senate Committee that 730 airmen had been captured on Cold War spy flights.

Prisoners

Walter Ciszek, Polish-American Jesuit priest who conducted  clandestine missionary work in the Soviet Union between 1939 and 1963.
Homer Harold Cox, kidnapped in East Berlin in 1949 and released in 1953, together with US Merchant Marine Leland Towers.
Alexander Dolgun
Lovett Fort-Whiteman, American political activist and Communist International functionary.
William Marchuk, kidnapped in 1949 and released in 1955.
John H. Noble, American businessman in Germany.
Isaiah Oggins, American communist and spy for the Soviet secret police.
Thomas Sgovio, American artist, ex-Communist.
Margaret Werner Tobien, together with her mother they were accused of espionage in 1943. Earlier, in 1937 her father, a worker of Ford Motors in the Soviet Union, was accused of treason.

See also
The Forsaken: An American Tragedy in Stalin's Russia

References

External links
COLUMN ONE : American Ghosts in the Gulag : Sightings of U.S. POWs in Siberia were reported during the Cold War. The U.S. plans to press the Soviets for details of their fates at this week’s summit By DOYLE McMANUS July 29, 1991 Los Angeles Times

Foreign Gulag detainees
American people imprisoned in the Soviet Union
20th-century American people